The 1813 Connecticut gubernatorial election took place on April 12, 1813.

Federalist Lieutenant Governor John Cotton Smith had become acting Governor on the death of Governor Roger Griswold on October 25, 1812. Smith was elected to a term in his own right, defeating Democratic-Republican nominee Elijah Boardman.

General election

Candidates
Elijah Boardman, Democratic-Republican, former member of the Connecticut House of Representatives, Democratic-Republican nominee for Governor in 1812
John Cotton Smith, Federalist, acting Governor

Results

Notes

References

Gubernatorial
Connecticut
1813